National Secondary Route 150, or just Route 150 (or ) is a National Road Route of Costa Rica, located in the Guanacaste province.

Description
In Guanacaste province the route covers Nicoya canton (Nicoya, San Antonio, Sámara, Belén de Nosarita districts).

References

Highways in Costa Rica